The 2013–14 Boston College Eagles men's basketball team represented Boston College during the 2013–14 NCAA Division I men's basketball season. The Eagles, led by fourth year head coach Steve Donahue, played their games at Conte Forum and were members of the Atlantic Coast Conference. On February 19, the Eagles achieved what is considered the biggest win of Donahue's tenure at BC by beating #1-ranked and previously undefeated Syracuse on the road in the Carrier Dome, 62-59 in overtime. Although this was a conference game, the result could easily be considered the most-shocking upset of the 2013-2014 college basketball season. Unfortunately, it proved to be the lone bright spot for the Eagles as they finished the season 8–24, 4–14 in ACC play to finish in 14th place. They lost in the first round of the ACC tournament to Georgia Tech. On March 18, 2014, Donahue was fired from his position as head coach. On April 3, Donahue was replaced by Jim Christian, most recently the head coach at Ohio.

Departures

Recruiting

Roster

Schedule and results 

|-
!colspan=9 style=| Regular season

|-
!colspan=9 style=| ACC tournament

See also
2013–14 Boston College Eagles women's basketball team

Boston College Eagles men's basketball seasons
Boston College
Boston College Eagles men's basketball
Boston College Eagles men's basketball
Boston College Eagles men's basketball
Boston College Eagles men's basketball